Nikita Thukral is an Indian actress and model, who has acted in Kannada, Telugu, Malayalam and Tamil films.

Early life
Thukral was born into a Punjabi Hindu family and was raised in Mumbai. She completed her M.A in Economics from Kishinchand Chellaram College, Mumbai. She was spotted by producer D. Ramanaidu while dining at a hotel in Juhu. He offered her a role in his upcoming film Hai (2002).

Career
Thukral was the part of Aati Rahengi Baharein crew, which was a popular television drama series that aired on Zee TV channel on 9 September 2002. She then shifted to the South film industry by debuting in the Telugu film Hai. After appearing in Hai, Thukral starred opposite Fahad Fazil in his film debut Kaiyethum Doorath. The Malayalam film was not a box office success, but she was able to find additional roles in Tamil and Telugu films like Kurumbu and Sambaram. In 2005, she entered Kannada cinema with Kichcha Sudeepa's Maharaja. Thukral then returned to star in a Tamil film and featured in Venkat Prabhu's multistarrer Saroja as Kalyani, the concubine of a gangster portrayed by Sampath Raj, and won critical acclaim for her performance. Her appearance in the song "Kodana Kodi" was appreciated as the song became popular, while her role in the film also led to her winning the ITFA Best Supporting Actress Award. The success led her to sign on to appear in a big film production, Gautham Vasudev Menon's Chennaiyil Oru Mazhaikaalam in a role alongside Trisha Krishnan, but the film was shelved after two schedules.

After 2008, she shifted her priority from Telugu to Kannada cinema, going on to co-star with leading actors Upendra, Puneeth Rajkumar, V. Ravichandran and Darshan. After Prince, she signed on to be part of several films including Cottonpet and Priyasakha, opposite Ramesh Aravind and a Telugu film named Apartment, but none of them saw a theatrical release. Her next releases were the Tamil thriller film Muran, that saw her playing Indhu, alongside actors Cheran and Prasanna and the historical film, Kranthiveera Sangolli Rayanna. Her only 2013 release was the Tamil masala film Alex Pandian. In 2014, she was seen in three Kannada films, although two of them, Namaste Madam and Namo Bhootatma, featured in her cameo roles only. Her future films include the crime drama Ring Road Shubha, reportedly the first Kannada film to be made by an all-women crew, the horror flick Avunu 2 in Telugu as well as the anthological drama Traffic that would mark her Hindi debut.

In addition to acting, Thukral has also done modelling work for designer Roopa Vohra. She also participated in the first season of the reality show Bigg Boss Kannada, the Kannada version of Bigg Boss. She completed 99 days in the Bigg Boss Home and was the second runner-up of the show.

Filmography

Film

Television

References

External links
 
 
 
 

Actresses in Tamil cinema
Actresses from Mumbai
Actresses in Kannada cinema
Actresses in Telugu cinema
Living people
Actresses in Malayalam cinema
Punjabi people
Indian television actresses
International Tamil Film Award winners
Actresses in Hindi cinema
Indian film actresses
21st-century Indian actresses
Bigg Boss Kannada contestants
Year of birth missing (living people)